Dexter Freebish is a band based in Austin, Texas, consisting of Robert Kyle (lead singer), Scott Romig (guitarist), Chris Lowe (bassist/backing vocalist), Charles Martin (additional guitarist), and Rob Schilz (drummer). They are perhaps best known for the 2000 single "Leaving Town," which peaked at number 11 on the Billboard Bubbling Under Hot 100. They have released five albums and one extended play, with their most recent release being the October 19, 2010 LP Shine On.

History
The band was originally named "The Twigs" while starting out in Austin, TX playing a residency at Hondo's on 6th Street. They later changed it to Dexter Freebish. The name comes from "Dexter Frebish's Electric Roller Ride", the name of a former roller coaster at Astroworld theme park in Houston, TX. (Note that the coaster's name has only one 'e' in 'Frebish')

In 1999, the band won the John Lennon Songwriting Contest Song of the Year for their song “Leaving Town," picked from approximately 27,000 entries. They eventually signed with Capitol Records and recorded their first major label album in 2000 titled A Life of Saturdays. The lead single, "Leaving Town," was a Top 40 radio hit, peaking at 22 on the US pop charts on February 24, 2001. The song's video was played frequently on VH1 and MTV2. The second single, "My Madonna," received moderate radio play but failed to chart. In 2001, Dexter Freebish was personally invited by Yoko Ono to play at the Rock and Roll Hall of Fame for the opening of the John Lennon Exhibit. Several of Dexter Freebish's songs have appeared on MTV's The Real World. The band has also toured the world and played several shows for the U.S. Navy stationed in the Middle East, Asia, and Europe.

In 2001, Dexter Freebish contributed a live performance of their song "My Madonna" to the charity album Live in the X Lounge IV. Soon after, the band decided to part ways with Capitol Records due to creative differences. Their next album, Tripped Into Divine, was released on Independent record label Sixthman Records. The lead single, "Prozak", won Best Rock Song in the 2004 John Lennon Songwriting Contest.

After a four-year hiatus, the band partnered up with Artwerk, a joint venture between Electronic Arts and the Nettwerk Music Group. The band announced the release of a 'Best Songs' album, set to be released January 13, 2009.  The album consisted of re-recorded songs from the band's previous catalog, as well as four brand new tracks.  October 19, 2010 the band released "Shine On", their first full-length album of new material in over six years.

Their songs have been featured in several video games, mostly with the Electronic Arts label. The song "Ghosts" is featured in Tiger Woods PGA Tour 2004, "Save Me" in Superman Returns, and both "Falling Down" and "Life of Saturdays" in NHL 2004. "Pretty People" was re-recorded in Simlish for Maxis-Electronic Arts game The Sims 2: University, and "The Other Side" is featured in The Sims 3, which was released June 2, 2009.

Albums

References

External links

Dexter Freebish official Myspace page
The official Dexter Freebish Facebook page
The official Dexter Freebish Twitter page

Capitol Records artists
Musical groups from Austin, Texas
Rock music groups from Texas
Musical groups established in 1995
1995 establishments in Texas